The Mexican Consulate is a historic adobe house in Yuma, Arizona. It was built circa 1892 for Dionicio Sanchez and his wife, Mary. In 1897, it was purchased by John Stoffela, who rented it to Henry M. Gandolfo, the Mexican consul, in the 1900s. The house houses the Mexican consulate in Yuma while Gandolfo resided here. It remained in the Stoffela family until 1978. It has been listed on the National Register of Historic Places since December 7, 1982.

References

Adobe buildings and structures
National Register of Historic Places in Yuma County, Arizona
Houses completed in 1892
1892 establishments in Arizona Territory